Miqdaad Versi is director for media monitoring at the Muslim Council of Britain. As well as holding the position as one of the council's active public representatives, Versi is also engaged with the media voicing concerns over the misrepresentation of Muslims. The Guardian described him as "the UK’s one-man Islamophobia media monitor."

Versi occasionally writes opinion pieces for the Guardian and the Independent. He is a board member of Rights Watch UK. Versi also runs a travel agency in north-west London full-time.

Versi grew up in Harrow, London. His father moved to the UK from east Africa in the 1970s and worked as an engineer. His mother worked as a nursery teacher. He read mathematics at the University of Oxford.

During his university studies, in pursuit of his interest in Islamic jurisprudence, Versi spent one year in Damascus, Syria learning Arabic and Islamic law. He later worked for Oliver Wyman and then for the Royal Bank of Scotland.

References 

Year of birth missing (living people)
Living people
English Muslims
Alumni of the University of Oxford